The SS Paul Hamilton (Hull Number 227) was a Liberty ship built in the United States during World War II. She was named after Paul Hamilton, the third  United States Secretary of the Navy. Se was operated by the Black Diamond Steamship Company under  charter with the Maritime Commission and War Shipping Administration.

On her fifth voyage  the SS Paul Hamilton left Hampton Roads, Virginia on 2 April 1944 as part of convoy UGS 38, carrying supplies and the ground personnel of the 485th Bombardment Group of the United States Army Air Forces to Italy. On the evening of 20 April it was attacked 30 miles (48 km) off the coast of Cape Bengut near Algiers in the Mediterranean Sea by 23 German Ju 88 bombers of III./Kampfgeschwader 26, I. and III./Kampfgeschwader 77.  One aerial torpedo struck the Paul Hamilton and detonated the cargo of high explosives and bombs, and the ship and crew disappeared within 30 seconds.  The crew and passengers, who included 154 officers and men of the 831st Bombardment Squadron and 317 officers and men of the 32nd Photo Reconnaissance Squadron, were all lost. Of the 580 men aboard only one body was recovered.

References

External links
 They Died Together; The Vagaries of War – An eyewitness account by an ex-Merchant Marine seaman.
Roll of Honor
S.S. Paul Hamilton listing of those lost

Liberty ships
Ships sunk by German aircraft
1942 ships
Ships lost with all hands
Maritime incidents in April 1944
World War II shipwrecks in the Mediterranean Sea
Naval magazine explosions